Walk the Line: Original Motion Picture Soundtrack is the soundtrack album to the 2005  biographical drama film of the same name released November 15, 2005 by Wind-Up Records. There are nine songs performed by Joaquin Phoenix (as Johnny Cash), four songs by Reese Witherspoon (as June Carter Cash), one song by Waylon Payne (as Jerry Lee Lewis), one song by Johnathan Rice (as Roy Orbison), two songs by Tyler Hilton (as Elvis Presley), and one song by Shooter Jennings (as Waylon Jennings). At the Golden Globe Awards Joaquin Phoenix was awarded the Best Actor – Comedy or Musical and Reese Witherspoon was awarded the Best Actress – Comedy or Musical, as well as the film won the Best Motion Picture – Musical or Comedy. Joaquin Phoenix and Reese Witherspoon were also nominated for the Academy Award for Best Actor and Best Actress, which Witherspoon won.

Walk the Line is an enhanced CD which also contains two deleted scenes from the film: Phoenix performing "Rock 'n' Roll Ruby" and Phoenix and Witherspoon together near the scene of "Jackson".

The cover features the two stars in an early publicity still, several of which were included as bonus postcards in the Collector's Edition DVD.

As of May 17, 2006 the soundtrack was certified platinum by the RIAA with over 1,000,000 copies sold.

On February 11, 2007 this album won a Grammy Award for Best Compilation Soundtrack Album for Motion Pictures, Television or Other Visual Media.

Track listing

Additional tracks
The film also featured a variety of country, rockabilly and traditional scoring. They were not featured on the soundtrack CD.

"Engine 143" – The Carter Family
"Highway 61 Revisited" – Bob Dylan
"Didn't It Rain" – Sister Rosetta Tharpe
"Dark Was the Night, Cold Was the Ground" – Blind Willie Johnson
"Volksmusik Medley" – Hans Glisha Orchestra
"I Was There When It Happened" – The Blackwood Brothers
"Try Me One Time" – Willie Nix
"Ain't That Right" – Eddie Snow
"Boogie Blues" – Earl Peterson
"I Miss You Already" – Faron Young
"Defrost Your Heart" – Charlie Feathers
"Feelin' Good" – Little Junior's Blue Flames
"Bop Bop Baby" – Wade and Dick
"Rock With My Baby" – Billy Riley
"Rock N' Roll Ruby" – Joaquin Phoenix
"Fujiyama Mama" – Wanda Jackson
"She Wears Red Feathers" – Guy Mitchell
"Easy Does It" – Lewis LaMedica
"Hey Porter" – Joaquin Phoenix
"Candy Man Blues" – Johnny Holiday
"I Got Stripes" – Joaquin Phoenix
"Light of the Night" – Werner Tautz
"You Get To Me" – Minnie and the Minuettes
"Time's a Wastin'" – Joaquin Phoenix and Reese Witherspoon
"Ring of Fire" – Reese Witherspoon
"Cartoon World"
"Ghost Town/Poem For Eva" – Bill Frisell
"In the Sweet By and By"
"Long Legged Guitar Pickin' Man" – Johnny Cash and June Carter
"Rainy Day Women #12 & 35" – Bob Dylan

Charts

Weekly charts

Year-end charts

Certifications

References

Biographical film soundtracks
2005 soundtrack albums
Wind-up Records soundtracks
Rockabilly soundtracks
Johnny Cash tribute albums
Grammy Award for Best Compilation Soundtrack for Visual Media